Whittlewood Forest is a former medieval hunting forest east of Silverstone in Northamptonshire in England. It is managed by the Forestry England. There are tracts of ancient woodland within it and old ditches can be found at the edges of several individual woods. The area has been the subject of extensive academic historical research. It is a Nature Conservation Review site, Grade 2.

Extent
The forest is mainly between the villages of Silverstone, Syresham, Abthorpe, Wicken, Potterspury and to the high Buckinghamshire boundary.  Interconnecting woods, made up in part by Hazelborough Wood, make up the main section.  Isolated woods such as Bucknell Wood and a scattered set east of the village of Whittlebury, as far as Potterspury make up most of the rest.  Remnants exist all around the villages and over the county boundary into Buckinghamshire and Milton Keynes; such outliers include Whistley Wood, west of Syresham.

Management
It is managed by the Forestry Commission, who also manage neighbouring woods such as Salcey Forest and Yardley Chase. Parts of the wood are protected as an SSSI, especially a number of separate copses which represent the remnants of the old semi-Royal Forest in the Honour of Grafton.

Ecology
It is notable for bluebells in mid-Spring in many parts of the forest together with other ancient woodland indicator species such as Yellow rattle and the Lesser celandine. There are stands of beech and oak interspersed with hazel coppice as well as conifer plantations within the forest. The conifer plantations are slowly being removed as a part of a national policy to restore ancient woodland. They will be replaced with native hardwoods such as oak and beech. As with most ancient woods, coppicing is no longer practised, and many former coppice stools can be seen in the woods.

Three types of deer are in the forest: red, roe and muntjac. Foxes and badgers are common.
Birds include buzzards and there are occasional sightings of the red kite, possibly from the expanding population in the Chilterns.

The SSSI is ancient semi-natural woodlands with many trees which are mature or over-mature, especially pedunculate oaks. There are also many ash trees and a scattering of silver birches and aspens. The oaks have nationally rare and nationally uncommon beetles, and there are locally rare lichens.

Access
Some areas are open to the public, and footpaths go through others such as Say's Copse, but some are private land.

See also
Ancient woodland
Salcey Forest
Yardley chase

References

Sites of Special Scientific Interest in Northamptonshire
Forests and woodlands of Northamptonshire
English royal forests
Nature Conservation Review sites